is a railway station on the privately operated Chōshi Electric Railway Line in Chōshi, Chiba, Japan.

Lines

Station layout

, the station is staffed, and consists of a side platform serving a single track, with a run-around loop used as a storage siding.

History
Tokawa Station opened on 5 July 1923.

Passenger statistics
In fiscal 2010, the station was used by an average of 209 passengers daily (boarding passengers only). The passenger figures for previous years are as shown below.

Surrounding area
 Tokawa Mini Furusato Museum
 Tokawa Harbour
 Chōshi Marina
 Nagasaki Beach
 Chiba Institute of Science

Eight fishing lanes
Close to Tokawa Station, there are eight historical lanes leading down the hill to the sea and fishing harbour. These are named as follows, from east to west.

Film location
The station building has been used as a filming location, including the 1985 NHK TV drama series .

See also
 List of railway stations in Japan

References

External links

 Choshi Electric Railway station information 
 Tokawa Mini Furusato Museum website 

Railway stations in Chiba Prefecture
Stations of Chōshi Electric Railway Line
Railway stations in Japan opened in 1923